Samaritans are an ethnoreligious group who originate from the ancient Israelites. They are native to the Levant and adhere to Samaritanism, an Abrahamic and ethnic religion.

Samaritan tradition claims the group descends from the northern Israelite tribes who were not deported by the Neo-Assyrian Empire after the destruction of the Kingdom of Israel. They consider Samaritanism to be the true religion of the ancient Israelites and regard Judaism as a closely related but altered religion. Samaritans also regard Mount Gerizim (near both Nablus and biblical Shechem), and not the Temple Mount in Jerusalem, to be the holiest place on Earth. They attribute the schism between Samaritanism and Judaism to have been caused by Eli creating an alternate shrine at Shiloh, in opposition to Mount Gerizim.

Once a large community, the Samaritan population shrank significantly in the wake of the brutal suppression of the Samaritan revolts against the Byzantine Empire. Mass conversion to Christianity under the Byzantines and later to Islam following the Muslim conquest of the Levant further reduced their numbers. In the 12th century, the Jewish traveler Benjamin of Tudela estimated that only around 1,900 Samaritans remained in the regions of Palestine and Syria.

As of 2021, the community stood at around 840 individuals, divided between Kiryat Luza on Mount Gerizim and the Samaritan compound in Holon. There are also small populations in Brazil and Sicily and elsewhere. The Samaritans in Kiryat Luza speak Levantine Arabic, while those in Holon primarily speak Israeli Hebrew. For the purposes of liturgy, Samaritan Hebrew and Samaritan Aramaic are used, both written in the Samaritan script. The head of the Samaritan community is the Samaritan High Priest.

Samaritans have a standalone religious status in Israel, and there are occasional conversions from Judaism to Samaritanism and vice versa, largely due to interfaith marriages. While Israel's rabbinic authorities came to consider Samaritanism to be a sect of Judaism, the Chief Rabbinate of Israel requires Samaritans to undergo a formal conversion to Judaism in order to be officially recognized as Halakhic Jews. Rabbinic literature rejected Samaritans unless they renounced Mount Gerizim as the historical Israelite holy site. Samaritans possessing only Israeli citizenship in Holon are drafted into the Israel Defense Forces, while those holding dual Israeli and Palestinian citizenship in Kiryat Luza are exempted from mandatory military service.

Etymology and terminology 
Inscriptions from the Samaritan diaspora in Delos, dating as early as 150-50 BCE, and perhaps slightly earlier, provide the "oldest known self-designation" for Samaritans, indicating that they called themselves "Israelites". Strictly speaking, the Samaritans now refer to themselves generally as "Israelite Samaritans."

In their own language the Samaritans call themselves Shamerim (שַמֶרִים), meaning "Guardians/Keepers/Watchers", and in Arabic.
The term is cognate with the Biblical Hebrew term Šomerim, and both terms reflect a Semitic root שמר, which means "to watch, guard".
Historically, Samaritans were concentrated in Samaria. In Modern Hebrew, the Samaritans are called Shomronim {שומרונים}, which also means "inhabitants of Samaria", literally, "Samaritans".

That the meaning of their name signifies Guardians/Keepers/Watchers [of the Law/Torah], rather than being a toponym referring to the inhabitants of the region of Samaria, was remarked on by a number of Christian Church fathers, including Epiphanius of Salamis in the Panarion, Jerome and Eusebius in the Chronicon and Origen in The Commentary on Saint John's Gospel.

Josephus uses several terms for the Samaritans, which he appears to use interchangeably. Among them is reference to Khuthaioi, a designation employed to denote peoples in Media and Persian putatively sent to Samaria to replace the exiled Israelite population. These Khouthaioi were in fact Hellenistic Phoenicians/Sidonians. Samareis (Σαμαρεῖς) may refer to inhabitants of the region of Samaria, or of the city of that name, though some texts use it to refer specifically to Samaritans.

Origins 

The similarities between Samaritans and Jews was such that the rabbis of the Mishnah found it impossible to draw a clear distinction between the two groups. Attempts to date when the schism among Israelites took place, which engendered the division between Samaritans and Judaeans, vary greatly, from the time of Ezra down to the destruction of Jerusalem (70 CE) and the Bar Kokhba revolt (132-136 CE). The emergence of a distinctive Samaritan identity, the outcome of a mutual estrangement between them and Jews, was something that developed over several centuries. Generally, a decisive rupture is believed to have taken place in the Hasmonean period.

Ancestrally, Samaritans affirm that they descend from the tribes of Ephraim and Manasseh in ancient Samaria. Samaritan tradition associates the split between them and the Judean-led Southern Israelites to the time of the biblical priest Eli, described as a "false" high priest who usurped the priestly office from its occupant, Uzzi, and established a rival shrine at Shiloh, and thereby prevented southern pilgrims from Judah and the territory of Benjamin from attending the shrine at Gerizim. Eli is also held to have created a duplicate of the Ark of the Covenant, which eventually made its way to the Judahite sanctuary in Jerusalem.

A Jewish Orthodox tradition, based on material in the Bible, Josephus and the Talmud, dates their presence much later, to the beginning of the Babylonian captivity. In Rabbinic Judaism, for example in the Tosefta Berakhot, the Samaritans are called Cuthites or Cutheans (Kutim), referring to the ancient city of Kutha, geographically located in what is today Iraq. Josephus in both the Wars of the Jews and the Antiquities of the Jews, in writing of the destruction of the temple on Mt. Gerizim by John Hyrcanus 1, also refers to the Samaritans as the Cuthaeans. In the biblical account, however, Kuthah was one of several cities from which people were brought to Samaria.

The Israeli biblical scholar Shemaryahu Talmon has supported the Samaritan tradition that they are mainly descended from the tribes of Ephraim and Manasseh who remained in Israel after the Assyrian conquest. He states that the description of them at 2 Kings 17:24 as foreigners is tendentious and intended to ostracize the Samaritans from those Israelites who returned from the Babylonian exile in 520 BCE. He further states that 2 Chronicles 30:1 could be interpreted as confirming that a large fraction of the tribes of Ephraim and Manasseh (i.e., Samaritans) remained in Israel after the Assyrian exile.

Modern genetic studies support the Samaritan narrative that they descend from indigenous Israelites. Shen et al. (2004) formerly speculated that outmarriage with foreign women may have taken place. Most recently the same group came up with genetic evidence that Samaritans are closely linked to Cohanim, and therefore can be traced back to an Israelite population prior to the Assyrian invasion. This correlates with expectations from the fact that the Samaritans retained endogamous and biblical patrilineal marriage customs, and that they remained a genetically isolated population.

Samaritan version 
The Samaritan traditions of their history are contained in the Kitab al-Ta'rikh compiled by Abu'l-Fath in 1355. According to this, a text which Magnar Kartveit identifies as a "fictional" apologia drawn from earlier sources, including Josephus but perhaps also from ancient traditions, a civil war erupted among the Israelites when Eli, son of Yafni, the treasurer of the sons of Israel, sought to usurp the High Priesthood of Israel from the heirs of Phinehas. Gathering disciples and binding them by an oath of loyalty, he sacrificed on the stone altar, without using salt, a rite which made the then High Priest Ozzi rebuke and disown him. Eli and his acolytes revolted and shifted to Shiloh, where he built an alternative Temple and an altar, a perfect replica of the original on Mt. Gerizim. Eli's sons Hophni and Phinehas had intercourse with women and feasted on the meats of the sacrifice, inside the Tabernacle. Thereafter Israel was split into three factions: the original Mt. Gerizim community of loyalists, the breakaway group under Eli, and heretics worshipping idols associated with the latter's sons. Judaism emerged later with those who followed the example of Eli.

Mount Gerizim was the original Holy Place of the Israelites from the time that Joshua conquered Canaan and the tribes of Israel settled the land. The reference to Mount Gerizim derives from the biblical story of Moses ordering Joshua to take the Twelve Tribes of Israel to the mountains by Shechem (Nablus) and place half of the tribes, six in number, on Mount Gerizim, the Mount of the Blessing, and the other half on Mount Ebal, the Mount of the Curse.

Biblical versions

Accounts of Samaritan origins in respectively 2 Kings 17:6,24 and Chronicles, together with statements in both Ezra and Nehemiah differ in important degrees, suppressing or highlighting narrative details according to the various intentions of their authors.

The emergence of the Samaritans as an ethnic and religious community distinct from other Levant peoples appears to have occurred at some point after the Assyrian conquest of the Israelite Kingdom of Israel in approximately 721 BCE. The records of Sargon II of Assyria indicate that he deported 27,290 inhabitants of the former kingdom.

Jewish tradition affirms the Assyrian deportations and replacement of the previous inhabitants by forced resettlement by other peoples but claims a different ethnic origin for the Samaritans. The Talmud accounts for a people called "Cuthim" on a number of occasions, mentioning their arrival by the hands of the Assyrians. According to 2 Kings 17:6, 24 and Josephus, the people of Israel were removed by the king of the Assyrians (Sargon II) to Halah, to Gozan on the Khabur River and to the towns of the Medes. The king of the Assyrians then brought people from Babylon, Kutha, Avva, Hamath and Sepharvaim to place in Samaria. Because God sent lions among them to kill them, the king of the Assyrians sent one of the priests from Bethel to teach the new settlers about God's ordinances. The eventual result was that the new settlers worshipped both the God of the land and their own gods from the countries from which they came.

In the Chronicles, following Samaria's destruction, King Hezekiah is depicted as endeavouring to draw the Ephraimites, Zebulonites, Asherites and Manassites closer to Judah. Temple repairs at the time of Josiah were financed by money from all "the remnant of Israel" in Samaria, including from Manasseh, Ephraim, and Benjamin. Jeremiah likewise speaks of people from Shechem, Shiloh, and Samaria who brought offerings of frankincense and grain to the House of YHWH. Chronicles makes no mention of an Assyrian resettlement. Yitzakh Magen argues that the version of Chronicles is perhaps closer to the historical truth and that the Assyrian settlement was unsuccessful, a notable Israelite population remained in Samaria, part of which, following the conquest of Judah, fled south and settled there as refugees.

Adam Zertal dates the Assyrian onslaught at 721 BCE to 647 BCE, infers from a pottery type he identifies as Mesopotamian clustering around the Menasheh lands of Samaria, that they were three waves of imported settlers.

The Encyclopaedia Judaica (under "Samaritans") summarizes both past and present views on the Samaritans' origins. It says:

Furthermore, to this day the Samaritans claim descent from the tribe of Joseph.

Josephus's version
Josephus, a key source, has long been considered a prejudiced witness hostile to the Samaritans,  He displays an ambiguous attitude, calling them both a distinct, opportunistic ethnos and, alternatively, a Jewish sect.

Dead Sea scrolls 
The Dead Sea scrolls' Proto-Esther fragment 4Q550c has an obscure phrase about the possibility of a Kutha(ean)(Kuti) man returning but the reference remains obscure. 4Q372 records hopes that the northern tribes will return to the land of Joseph. The current dwellers in the north are referred to as fools, an enemy people. However, they are not referred to as foreigners. It goes on to say that the Samaritans mocked Jerusalem and built a temple on a high place to provoke Israel.

History

Iron Age 
The narratives in Genesis about the rivalries among the twelve sons of Jacob are viewed by some as describing tensions between north and south. According to the Hebrew Bible, they were temporarily united under a United Monarchy, but after the death of Solomon, the kingdom split in two, the northern Kingdom of Israel with its last capital city Samaria and the southern Kingdom of Judah with its capital, Jerusalem. The Deuteronomistic history, written in Judah, portrayed Israel as a sinful kingdom, divinely punished for its idolatry and iniquity by being destroyed by the Neo-Assyrian Empire in 720 BCE. The tensions continued in the post-exilic period. The Books of Kings are more inclusive than Ezra–Nehemiah since the ideal is of one Israel with twelve tribes, whereas the Books of Chronicles concentrate on the Kingdom of Judah and ignore the Kingdom of Israel.

Contemporary scholarship confirms that deportations did take place both before and after the Assyrian conquest of the Kingdom of Israel in 722-720 BCE. However, these deportations are thought to have been less severe than the Book of Kings portrays. During the earlier Assyrian invasions, the Transjordan did experience significant deportations, with entire tribes vanishing; the tribes of Reuben, Gad, Dan, and Naphtali are never again mentioned. However, Samaria was a larger and more populated area, and even if the Assyrians did deport 30,000 people as they claimed, many would have remained in the area. The cities of Samaria and Megiddo were mostly left intact, and the rural communities were generally left alone. Some scholars have claimed there's no evidence to support the settlement of foreigners in the area, however, others disagree. Nevertheless, the Book of Chronicles records that King Hezekiah of Judah invited members of the tribes of Ephraim, Zebulun, Asher, Issachar and Manasseh to Jerusalem to celebrate Passover after the destruction of Israel. In light of this, it has been suggested that the bulk of those who survived the Assyrian invasions remained in the region. The Samaritan community of today is thought to be predominantly descended from those who remained.

Samaritans claim to be descended from the Israelites of ancient Samaria who were not expelled by the Assyrian conquerors of the northern kingdom of Israel in 722 BCE. They had their own sacred precinct on Mount Gerizim and claimed that it was the original sanctuary. Moreover, they claimed that their version of the Pentateuch was the original and that the Jews had a falsified text produced by Ezra during the Babylonian exile. Both Jewish and Samaritan religious leaders taught that it was wrong to have any contact with the opposite group, and neither was to enter the other's territories or even to speak to the other. During the New Testament period, the tensions were exploited by Roman authorities as they likewise had done between rival tribal factions elsewhere, and Josephus reports numerous violent confrontations between Jews and Samaritans throughout the first half of the first century.

Persian period 

According to Chronicles 36:22–23, the Persian emperor, Cyrus the Great (reigned 559–530 BCE), permitted the return of the exiles to their homeland and ordered the rebuilding of the Temple (Zion). The prophet Isaiah identified Cyrus as "the Lord's Messiah".

During the First Temple, it was possible for foreigners to help the Jewish people in an informal way until tension grew between the Samaritans and Judeans. This meant that foreigners could physically move into Judean land and abide by its laws and religion.

Ezra 4 says that the local inhabitants of the land offered to assist with the building of the new Temple during the time of Zerubbabel, but their offer was rejected. According to Ezra, this rejection precipitated a further interference not only with the rebuilding of the Temple but also with the reconstruction of Jerusalem. The issue surrounding the Samaritans offer to help rebuild the temple was a complicated one that took a while for the Judeans to think over. There had always been a division between the north and the south and this instance perfectly illustrates that. Following Solomon's death, sectionalism formed and inevitably led to the division of the kingdom. This division led to the Judeans rejecting the offer made by the Samaritans to centralise worship at the Temple.

The text is not clear on this matter, but one possibility is that these "people of the land" were thought of as Samaritans. We do know that Samaritan and Jewish alienation increased and that the Samaritans eventually built their own temple on Mount Gerizim, near Shechem.

The term "Cuthim" applied by Jews to the Samaritans had clear pejorative connotations, and is regarded as an insult to Samaritanism, implying that they were interlopers brought in from Kutha in Mesopotamia and rejecting their claim of descent from the ancient Tribes of Israel.

The archaeological evidence can find no sign of habitation in the Assyrian and Babylonian periods at Mount Gerizim, but indicates the existence of a sacred precinct on the site in the Persian period, by the 5th century BCE. According to most modern scholars, the split between the Jews and Samaritans was a gradual historical process extending over several centuries rather than a single schism at a given point in time.

Hellenistic period

Antiochus IV Epiphanes and Hellenization 
Antiochus IV Epiphanes was on the throne of the Seleucid Empire from 175 to 163 BCE. His policy was to Hellenize his entire kingdom and standardize religious observance. According to 1 Maccabees 1:41-50 he proclaimed himself the incarnation of the Greek god Zeus and mandated death to anyone who refused to worship him. In the 2nd century BCE, a series of events led to a revolution by a faction of Judeans against Antiochus IV.

The universal peril led the Samaritans, eager for safety, to repudiate all connection and kinship with the Jews. The request was granted. This was put forth as the final breach between the two groups. The breach was described at a much later date in the Christian Bible (John 4:9), "For Jews have no dealings with Samaritans."

Anderson notes that during the reign of Antiochus IV (175–164 BCE):

Josephus Book 12, Chapter 5 quotes the Samaritans as saying:

Destruction of the temple 
During the Hellenistic period, Samaria was largely divided between a Hellenizing faction based in Samaria (Sebastia) and a pious faction in Shechem and surrounding rural areas, led by the High Priest. Samaria was a largely autonomous state nominally dependent on the Seleucid Empire until around 110 BCE, when the Hasmonean ruler John Hyrcanus destroyed the Samaritan temple and devastated Samaria. Only a few stone remnants of the temple exist today.

Roman period

Early Roman era 
Under the Roman Empire, Samaria became a part of the Herodian Tetrarchy, and with the deposition of the Herodian ethnarch Herod Archelaus in the early 1st century CE, Samaria became a part of the province of Judaea.

Samaritans appear briefly in the Christian gospels, most notably in the account of the Samaritan woman at the well and the parable of the Good Samaritan. In the former, it is noted that a substantial number of Samaritans accepted Jesus through the woman's testimony to them, and Jesus stayed in Samaria for two days before returning to Cana. In the latter, it is only the Samaritan who helped the man stripped of clothing, beaten, and left on the road half dead, his Abrahamic covenantal circumcision implicitly evident. The priest and Levite walked past. But the Samaritan helped the naked man regardless of his nakedness (itself religiously offensive to the priest and Levite), his self-evident poverty, or to which Hebrew sect he belonged.

The Temple of Gerizim was rebuilt after the Bar Kokhba revolt against the Romans, around 136 CE. A building dating to the second century BCE, the Delos Synagogue, is commonly identified as a Samaritan synagogue, which would make it the oldest known Jewish or Samaritan synagogue.

Much of the Samaritan liturgy was set by the high priest Baba Rabba in the 4th century.

Byzantine times 

According to Samaritan sources, Eastern Roman emperor Zeno (who ruled 474–491 and whom the sources call "Zait the King of Edom") persecuted the Samaritans. The Emperor went to Neapolis (Shechem), gathered the elders and asked them to convert to Christianity; when they refused, Zeno had many Samaritans killed, and re-built the synagogue as a church. Zeno then took for himself Mount Gerizim, and built several edifices, among them a tomb for his recently deceased son, on which he put a cross, so that the Samaritans, worshiping God, would prostrate in front of the tomb. Later, in 484, the Samaritans revolted. The rebels attacked Sichem, burned five churches built on Samaritan holy places and cut the finger of bishop Terebinthus, who was officiating at the ceremony of Pentecost. They elected a Justa (or Justasa/Justasus) as their king and moved to Caesarea, where a noteworthy Samaritan community lived. Here several Christians were killed and the church of St. Sebastian was destroyed. Justa celebrated the victory with games in the circus. According to the Chronicon Paschale, the dux Palaestinae Asclepiades, whose troops were reinforced by the Caesarea-based Arcadiani of Rheges, defeated Justa, killed him and sent his head to Zeno. According to Procopius, Terebinthus went to Zeno to ask for revenge; the Emperor personally went to Samaria to quell the rebellion.

Some modern historians believe that the order of the facts preserved by Samaritan sources should be inverted, as the persecution of Zeno was a consequence of the rebellion rather than its cause, and should have happened after 484, around 489. Zeno rebuilt the church of St. Procopius in Neapolis (Sichem) and the Samaritans were banned from Mount Gerizim, on whose top a signaling tower was built to alert in case of civil unrest.

According to an anonymous biography of Mesopotamian monk named Barsauma, whose pilgrimage to the region in the early 5th century was accompanied by clashes with locals and the forced conversion of non-Christians, Barsauma managed to convert Samaritans by conducting demonstrations of healing. Jacob, an ascetic healer living in a cave near Porphyreon, Mount Carmel in the 6th century CE, attracted admirers, including Samaritans who later converted to Christianity. Under growing government pressure, many Samaritans who refused to convert to Christianity in the sixth century may have preferred paganism and even Manicheism.

Under a charismatic, messianic figure named Julianus ben Sabar (or ben Sahir), the Samaritans launched a war to create their own independent state in 529. With the help of the Ghassanids, Emperor Justinian I crushed the revolt; tens of thousands of Samaritans died or were enslaved. The Samaritan faith, which had previously enjoyed the status of religio licita, was virtually outlawed thereafter by the Christian Byzantine Empire; from a population once at least in the hundreds of thousands, the Samaritan community dwindled to tens of thousands.

The Samaritan population in Samaria did, however, survive the revolts. During a pilgrimage to the Holy Land in 570 CE, a Christian pilgrim from Piacenza travelled through Samaria and recorded the following: "From there we went up past a number of places belonging to Samaria and Judaea to the city of Sebaste, the resting-place of the Prophet Elisha. There were several Samaritan cities and villages on our way down through the plains, and wherever we passed along the streets they burned away our footprints with straw, whether we were Christians or Jews, they have such a horror of both". A change in the local population's identity throughout the Byzantine period is not indicated by the archeological findings either.

Early Islamic period 
By the time of the Muslim conquest of the Levant, apart from Palestine, small dispersed communities of Samaritans were living also in Arab Egypt, Syria, and Iran. According to Milka Levy-Rubin, many Samaritans converted under Abbasid and Tulunid rule (878-905 CE), having been subjected to harsh hardships such as droughts, earthquakes, persecution by local governors, high taxes on religious minorities and anarchy.

Like other non-Muslims in the empire, such as Jews, Samaritans were often considered to be People of the Book, and were guaranteed religious freedom. Their minority status was protected by the Muslim rulers, and they had the right to practice their religion, but, as dhimmi, adult males had to pay the jizya or "protection tax". This however changed during late Abbasid period, with increasing persecution targeting the Samaritan community and considering them infidels which must convert to Islam. 

Anarchy overtook Palestine during the early years of Abassid Caliph al-Ma'mun (813–833 CE), when his rule was challenged by internal strife. According to the Chronicle of Abu l-Fath, during this time, many clashes took place, the locals suffered from famine and even fled their homes out of fear, and "many left their faith". An exceptional case is of ibn Firāsa, a rebel who arrived in Palestine in the year 830 and was said to have loathed Samaritans and persecuted them. He punished them, forced them to convert to Islam, and filled the prisons with Samaritan men, women, and children, keeping them there until many of them perished from hunger and thirst. He had also demanded payment for enabling them to circumcise their sons on the eighth day. A lot of people abandoned their religion at that time. The revolt was put down, but caliph al-Mu'tasim then increased taxes on the rebels, which sparked a second uprising. Rebel forces captured Nablus, where they set fire to synagogues belonging to the Samaritan and Dosithian (Samaritan sect) faiths. The community's situation briefly improved when this uprising was put down by Abassid forces, and High Priest Pinhas ben Netanel resumed worship in the Nablus synagogue. Under the reign of al-Wāthiq bi-llāh, Abu-Harb Tamim, who had the support of Yaman tribes, led yet another uprising. He captured Nablus and caused many to flee, the Samaritan High Priest was injured, and later died of his wounds in Hebron. The Samaritans couldn't go back to their homes until Abu-Harb tamim was vanquished and captured (842 CE).

A number of restrictions on the dhimmi were reinstituted during the reign of the Abbasid Caliph al-Mutawakkil (847–861 CE), prices increased once more, and many people experienced severe poverty. "Many people lost faith as a result of the terrible price increases and because they became weary of paying the jizya. There were many sons and families who left their faith and became lost". The tradition of men wearing a red tarboosh may also go back to an order by al-Mutawakkil, that required non-Muslims to be distinguished from Muslims.

The numerous instances of Samaritans converting to Islam that are mentioned in the Chronicle of Abu l-Fath are all connected to economic difficulties that led to widespread poverty among the Samaritan population, anarchy that left Samaritans defenseless against Muslim attackers, and attempts by those people and others to force conversion on the Samaritans. It is crucial to keep in mind that the Samaritan community was the smallest among the other dhimmi communities and that it was also situated in Samaria, where Muslim settlement continued to expand as evidenced by the text; by the ninth century, villages such as Sinjil and Jinsafut were already Muslim. This makes it possible to assume that the Samaritans were more vulnerable than other dhimmi, what greatly broadened the extent of their Islamization.

Archaeological data demonstrates that during the 8th and 9th centuries, winepresses west of Samaria stopped operating, but the villages to which they belonged persisted. Such sites could be securely identified as Samaritan in some of those cases, and it is likely in others. According to one theory, the local Samaritans who converted to Islam kept their villages going but were barred by Islamic law from making wine. These findings date to the Abassid period, and are in accordance with the Islamization process as described in the historical sources.

As time goes on, more information from recorded sources refers to Nablus and less to the vast agricultural regions that the Samaritans had previously inhabited. Hence, the Abassid era marks the disappearance of Samaritan rural habitation in Samaria. By the end of the period, Samaritans were mainly centered in Nablus, while other communities persisted in Caesarea, Cairo, Damascus, Aleppo, Sarepta, and Ascalon.

Crusader period 
During the Crusades, the Frankish takeover of Nablus, where the majority of Samaritans lived,  was relatively peaceful compared to the massacres elsewhere where one can assume that Samaritans shared the fate of Arabs and Jews generally in Palestine by being put to death or enslaved. Such acts took place in Samaritan maritime communities in Arsuf, Caesarea, Acre and perhaps Ascalon. During the initial razzia in Nablus, nonetheless, the invading Franks destroyed Samaritan buildings and sometime later tore down their ritual bath and synagogue on Mt. Gerizim. Christians bearing crosses successfully pleaded for a calm transition. Like the non-Latin Christian inhabitants of the Kingdom of Jerusalem, came to be tolerated and perhaps favored because they were docile and had been mentioned positively in the New Testament. The calamities that befell them during the Frankish reign came from Muslims such as the commander of the Dasmascene army, Bazwȃdj, who raided Nablus in 1137 and abducted 500 Samaritan men, women and children back to Damascus.

Ayyubid and Mamluk rule 
Two hundred Samaritans were reportedly forced to convert to Islam in the village of Immatain by Saladin, according to a tradition recalled by a Samaritan High Priest in the 20th century; however, written sources make no reference to this event.

Ottoman rule 

According to the Ottoman censuses of 1525–1526, 25 Samaritan families lived in Gaza, and 29 families lived in Nablus. In 1548–1549, there were 18 families in Gaza and 34 in Nablus.

The Samaritan community in Egypt shrank as a result of Ottoman persecution of Samaritans who worked for the Mamluk government and the majority of them converting to Islam. In Damascus, the majority of the Samaritan community was massacred or converted to Islam during the reign of the Ottoman Pasha Mardam Beqin in the early 17th century. The remainder of the Samaritan community there, in particular the Danafi family, which is still influential today, moved back to Nablus in the 17th century. The Matari family relocated from Gaza to Nablus at about the same time that the Marhiv family moved back from Sarafand, Lebanon. There were no longer any Samaritans in either Gaza or Damascus; only a handful remained in Gaza. 

The Nablus community endured because most of the surviving diaspora returned, and they have maintained a tiny presence there to this day. In 1624, the last Samaritan High Priest of the line of Eleazar son of Aaron died without issue, but according to Samaritan tradition, descendants of Aaron's other son, Ithamar, remained and took over the office.

Following the death of High Priest Shelamia ben Pinhas, Muslim persecution of Samaritans intensified, and they became the target of violent riots that led to many of them converting to Islam. In 1624, access to Mount Gerizim's summit was outlawed for the survivors, and they were only permitted to make Passover sacrifices on the mountain's eastern slopes. By the middle of the 17th century, very small Samaritan communities survived in Nablus, Gaza, and Jaffa.

The status of the Samaritan community of Nablus greatly improved in the early 18th century because one of them, Ibrahim al-Danafi, who was also a poet and an author, worked for the Tuqan family, which then dominated the city. Al-Danafi also bought the hill of Pinehas and the plot on Mount Gerizim's summit to be used by the community, but the favorable conditions that were necessary for the community's recovery did not last. The 1759 earthquake, the endemic that followed, and the other restrictions placed on the Samaritans limited the growth of their community, and by the end of the 18th century, there were only 200 people living there and living off of trade, brokerage, and tax collection.

During the 1840s, the ulama of Nablus began asserting that the Samaritans may not be considered "People of the Book" and therefore have the same status as pagans and must convert to Islam or die. As a result, locals attempted to force the conversion of two children of a Samaritan widow who had a Muslim lover in 1841. Her young daughter died from fear, but her 14-year-old boy converted to Islam. Another Samaritan was later coerced into converting to Islam. Appealing to the King of France did not help. The Samaritan people were eventually helped by the Jewish Hakham Bashi Chaim Abraham Gagin, who published a statement asserting that "the Samaritan people are a branch of the Israelites, who acknowledge the truthfulness of the Torah," and as such should be protected as a "People of the Book". The ulama ceased their preaching against Samaritans. The Samaritans also paid bribe to the Arabs, totaling approx. 1000 GBP, and eventually came out of their hiding places. However, they were prohibited from offering Passover sacrifices on Mount Gerizim until 1849.

By the late Ottoman period, the Samaritan community dwindled to its lowest. In the 19th century, with pressure of conversion and persecution from the local rulers and occasional natural disasters, the community fell to just over 100 persons.

Mandatory Palestine 

The situation of the Samaritan community improved significantly during the British Mandate of Palestine. At that time, they began to work in the public sector, like many other groups. With better medical care and Samaritan men marrying Jewish women, the demographic status of the community improved throughout the Mandatory period. The censuses of 1922 and 1931 recorded 163 and 182 Samaritans in Palestine, respectively. The majority of them lived in Nablus, 12 resided in Tulkarm, 12 in Jaffa, and 6 in As-Salt, Transjordan. Later some moved to Ramat Gan and even to Haifa.

During the 1929 Palestine riots, Arab rioters attacked Samaritans who were performing the Passover sacrifice on Mount Gerizim and flung stones at them as well as their guests. The British police got involved and stopped any potential fatalities.

Israeli, Jordanian and Palestinian rule 
After the end of the British Mandate of Palestine and the subsequent establishment of the State of Israel, some of the Samaritans who were living in Jaffa emigrated to Samaria and lived in Nablus. By the late 1950s, around 100 Samaritans left the West Bank for Israel under an agreement with the Jordanian authorities in the West Bank. In 1954, Israeli President Yitzhak Ben-Zvi fostered a Samaritan enclave in Holon, Israel, located in 15a Ben Amram Street. During Jordanian rule in the West Bank, Samaritans from Holon were permitted to visit Mount Gerizim only once a year, on Passover.

In 1967, Israel conquered the West Bank during the Six-Day War, and the Samaritans there came under Israeli rule. Until the 1990s, most of the Samaritans in the West Bank resided in the West Bank city of Nablus below Mount Gerizim. They relocated to the mountain itself near the Israeli settlement of Har Brakha as a result of violence during the First Intifada (1987–1990). Consequently, all that is left of the Samaritan community in Nablus itself is an abandoned synagogue. The Israeli army maintains a presence in the area. The Samaritans of Nablus relocated to the village of Kiryat Luza. In the mid-1990s, the Samaritans of Kiryat Luza were granted Israeli citizenship. They also became citizens of the Palestinian Authority following the Oslo Accords. As a result, they are the only people to possess dual Israeli-Palestinian citizenship. 

Today, Samaritans in Israel are fully integrated into society and serve in the Israel Defense Forces. The Samaritans of the West Bank seek good relations with their Palestinian neighbors while maintaining their Israeli citizenship, tend to be fluent in Hebrew and Arabic, and use both a Hebrew and Arab name.

Genetic studies

Demographic investigation 

Demographic investigations of the Samaritan community were carried out in the 1960s. Detailed pedigrees of the last 13 generations show that the Samaritans comprise four lineages:
 The priestly Cohen lineage from the tribe of Levi.
 The Tsedakah lineage, claiming descent from the tribe of Manasseh
 The Joshua-Marhiv lineage, claiming descent from the tribe of Ephraim
 The Danafi lineage, claiming descent from the tribe of Ephraim

Y-DNA and mtDNA comparisons 
Recently several genetic studies on the Samaritan population were made using haplogroup comparisons as well as wide-genome genetic studies. Of the 12 Samaritan males used in the analysis, 10 (83%) had Y chromosomes belonging to haplogroup J, which includes three of the four Samaritan families. The Joshua-Marhiv family belongs to Haplogroup J-M267 (formerly "J1"), while the Danafi and Tsedakah families belong to haplogroup J-M172 (formerly "J2"), and can be further distinguished by the M67 SNP—the derived allele of which has been found in the Danafi family—and the PF5169 SNP found in the Tsedakah family. However the biggest and most important Samaritan family, the Cohen family (Tradition: Tribe of Levi), was found to belong to haplogroup E.

A 2004 article on the genetic ancestry of the Samaritans by Shen et al. concluded from a sample comparing Samaritans to several Jewish populations, all currently living in Israel—representing the Beta Israel, Ashkenazi Jews, Iraqi Jews, Libyan Jews, Moroccan Jews, and Yemenite Jews, as well as Israeli Druze and Palestinians—that "the principal components analysis suggested a common ancestry of Samaritan and Jewish patrilineages. Most of the former may be traced back to a common ancestor in what is today identified as the paternally inherited Israelite high priesthood (Cohanim) with a common ancestor projected to the time of the Assyrian conquest of the kingdom of Israel."

Demographics

Figures 

There were 1 million Samaritans in biblical times, but in recent times the numbers are smaller. There were 100 in 1786 and 141 in 1919, then 150 in 1967. This grew to 745 in 2011, 751 in 2012, 756 in 2013, 760 in 2014, 777 in 2015, 785 in 2016, 796 in 2017, 810 in 2018 and 820 in 2019.

The Samaritan community dropped in numbers during the various periods of Muslim rule in the region. The Samaritans could not rely on foreign assistance as much as the Christians did, nor on a large number of diaspora immigrants as did the Jews. The once-flourishing community declined over time, either through emigration or conversion to Islam among those who remained.

Today, half reside in modern homes at Kiryat Luza on Mount Gerizim, which is sacred to them, and the rest in the city of Holon, just outside Tel Aviv. There are also four Samaritan families residing in Binyamina-Giv'at Ada, Matan, and Ashdod.
As a small community physically divided between neighbors in a hostile region, Samaritans have been hesitant to overtly take sides in the Arab–Israeli conflict, fearing that doing so could lead to negative repercussions. While the Samaritan communities in both the West Bank's Nablus and Israeli Holon have assimilated to the surrounding respective cultures, Hebrew has become the primary domestic language for Samaritans. Samaritans who are Israeli citizens are drafted into the military, along with the Jewish citizens of Israel.

Relations of Samaritans with Israeli Jews, Muslim and Christian Palestinians in neighboring areas have been mixed. Samaritans living in both Israel and in the West Bank have Israeli citizenship.

Samaritans in the Palestinian Authority-ruled territories are a minority in the midst of a Muslim majority. They had a reserved seat in the Palestinian Legislative Council in the election of 1996, but they no longer have one. Samaritans living in the West Bank have been granted passports by both Israel and the Palestinian Authority.

Community survival 

One of the biggest problems facing the community today is the issue of continuity. With such a small population, divided into only four families or houses (Cohen, Tsedakah, Danafi, and Marhiv, with the Matar family dying out in 1968), and a general refusal to accept converts, it is common for Samaritans to marry within their extended families, even first cousins. There has been a history of genetic disorders within the group due to the small gene pool. To counter this, the Holon Samaritan community has allowed men from the community to marry non-Samaritan (primarily, Israeli Jewish) women, provided that the women agree to follow Samaritan religious practices. There is a six-month trial period before officially joining the Samaritan community to see whether this is a commitment that the woman would like to take. This often poses a problem for the women, who are typically less than eager to adopt the strict interpretation of biblical (Levitical) laws regarding menstruation, by which they must live in a separate dwelling during their periods and after childbirth. There have been a few instances of intermarriage. In addition, all marriages within the Samaritan community are first approved by a geneticist at Tel HaShomer Hospital, in order to prevent the spread of genetic disorders. In meetings arranged by "international marriage agencies", a small number of women from Russia and Ukraine who agree to observe Samaritan religious practices have been allowed to marry into the Qiryat Luza Samaritan community in an effort to expand the gene pool.

The Samaritan community in Israel also faces demographic challenges as some young people leave the community and convert to Judaism. A notable example is Israeli television presenter Sofi Tsedaka, who has made a documentary about her leaving the community at age 18.

The head of the community is the Samaritan High Priest, who is the 133rd generation since Ithamar, a son of Aaron the priest's line from 1624 CE onward; before then, the line of priesthood went through Elazar, son of Aaron the priest. The current high priest is Aabed-El ben Asher ben Matzliach who assumed the office on 19 April 2013. The High Priest of every generation is selected by the eldest in age from the priestly family and resides on Mount Gerizim.

Samaritan origins of Palestinian Muslims in Nablus 
Much of the local Palestinian population of Nablus is believed to be descended from Samaritans who converted to Islam. According to the historian Fayyad Altif, large numbers of Samaritans converted due to persecution under various Muslim rulers, and because the monotheistic nature of Islam made it easy for them to accept it. The Samaritans themselves describe the Ottoman period as the worst period in their modern history, as many Samaritan families were forced to convert to Islam during that time. Even today, certain Nabulsi family names such as Al-Amad, Al-Samri, Maslamani, Yaish, and Shaksheer among others, are associated with Samaritan ancestry.

For the Samaritans in particular, the passing of the al-Hakim Edict by the Fatimid Caliphate in 1021, under which all Jews and Christians in the Southern Levant were ordered to either convert to Islam or leave, along with another notable forced conversion to Islam imposed at the hands of the rebel ibn Firāsa, would contribute to their rapid unprecedented decrease, and ultimately almost complete extinction as a separate religious community. As a result, they had decreased from nearly a million and a half in late Roman (Byzantine) times to 146 people by the end of the Ottoman period.

In 1940, the future Israeli president and historian Yitzhak Ben-Zvi wrote an article in which he stated that two thirds of the residents of Nablus and the surrounding neighboring villages were of Samaritan origin. He mentioned the name of several Palestinian Muslim families as having Samaritan origins, including the Al-Amad, Al-Samri, Buwarda and Kasem families, who protected Samaritans from Muslim persecution in the 1850s. He further claimed that these families had written records testifying to their Samaritan ancestry, which were maintained by their priests and elders.

Samaritanism 

Samaritanism is centered on the Samaritan Pentateuch, which Samaritans believe to be the original and unaltered version of the Torah that was given to Moses and the Israelites on Mount Sinai. The Samaritan Pentateuch contains some differences from the Masoretic version of the Torah used in Judaism; according to Samaritan tradition, key parts of the Jewish text were fabricated by Ezra. The Samaritan version of the Book of Joshua also differs from the Jewish version, which focuses on Shiloh. According to Samaritan tradition, Joshua built a temple (al-haikal) on Mount Gerizim and placed therein a tabernacle (al-maškan) in the second year of the Israelites' entry into the land of Canaan.

According to Samaritan scripture and tradition, Mount Gerizim, located near the Biblical city of Shechem (on the southern side of modern-day Nablus, West Bank), has been venerated as the holiest place for the Israelites since the conquest of Canaan by Joshua, long before the Temple in Jerusalem was established under Davidic and Solomonic rule over the United Kingdom of Israel. This view differs from Jewish belief which views the Temple Mount in Jerusalem as the holiest site in the world to worship God. It is commonly taught in Samaritan tradition that there are 13 references to Mount Gerizim in the Torah to prove their claim of holiness in contrast to Judaism, which relies solely on the later Jewish prophets and writings to back their claims of the holiness of Jerusalem.

Other Samaritan tradition books include the Memar Marqah (The teachings of Marqah), the Samaritan liturgy known as "the Defter", and Samaritan law codes and biblical commentaries.

Samaritans outside the Holy Land observe most Samaritan practices and rituals such as the Sabbath, ritual purity, and all festivals of Samaritanism with the exception of the Passover sacrifice, which can only be observed at Mount Gerizim.

Samaritan Temple 
According to Samaritans, it was on Mount Gerizim that Abraham was commanded by God to offer his son Isaac as a sacrifice. God then causes the sacrifice to be interrupted, explaining that this was the ultimate test of Abraham's obedience, as a result of which all the world would receive blessing.

The Torah mentions the place where God chooses to establish his name (Deuteronomy 12:5), and Judaism takes this to refer to Jerusalem. However, the Samaritan text speaks of the place where God  to establish his name, and Samaritans identify it as Mount Gerizim, making it the focus of their spiritual values.

The legitimacy of the Samaritan temple was attacked by Jewish scholars including Andronicus ben Meshullam.

In the Christian Bible, the Gospel of John relates an encounter between a Samaritan woman and Jesus in which she says that the mountain was the center of their worship. She poses the question to Jesus when she realizes that he is the Messiah. Jesus affirms the Jewish position, saying "You [that is, the Samaritans] worship what you do not know," although he also says, "a time is coming when you will worship the Father neither on this mountain nor in Jerusalem."

Religious beliefs 
 There is one God, YHWH, (informally referred to by Samaritans as "Shehmaa"), the same God recognized by the Hebrew prophets.
 The Torah was given by God to Moses.
 Mount Gerizim, not Jerusalem, is the one true sanctuary chosen by Israel's God.
 Many Samaritans believe that at the end of days, the dead will be resurrected by the Taheb, a restorer (possibly a prophet, some say Moses).
 Resurrection and Paradise. Samaritans accept the resurrection of the dead on the basis of Deuteronomy 32 also known as the Song of Moses, a tradition that is traced back to their sage Marqah.
 The priests are the interpreters of the law and the keepers of tradition; scholars are secondary to the priesthood.
 The authority of post-Torah sections of the Tanakh, and classical Jewish Rabbinical works (the Talmud, comprising the Mishnah and the Gemara) is rejected.
 They have a significantly different version of the Ten Commandments (for example, their 10th commandment is about the sanctity of Mount Gerizim).

The Samaritans have retained an offshoot of the Ancient Hebrew script, a High Priesthood, the slaughtering and eating of lambs on Passover eve, and the celebration of the first month's beginning around springtime as the New Year. Yom Teru'ah (the biblical name for "Rosh Hashanah"), at the beginning of Tishrei, is not considered a New Year as it is in Rabbinic Judaism. The Samaritan Pentateuch differs from the Jewish Masoretic Text as well. Some differences are doctrinal: for example, the Samaritan Torah explicitly states that Mount Gerizim is "the place that God " to establish his name, as opposed to the Jewish Torah that refers to "the place that God ". Other differences are minor and seem more or less accidental.

Relationship to Rabbinic Judaism 

Samaritans refer to themselves as Benai Yisrael ("Children of Israel"), which is a term used by all Jewish denominations as a name for the Jewish people as a whole. They, however, do not refer to themselves as Yehudim (literally "Judeans"), the standard Hebrew name for Jews.

The Talmudic attitude expressed in tractate Kutim is that they are to be treated as Jews in matters where their practice coincides with Rabbinic Judaism but as non-Jews where their practice differs. Some claim that since the 19th century, Rabbinic Judaism has regarded the Samaritans as a Jewish sect and the term "Samaritan Jews" has been used for them.

Religious texts 
Samaritan law is not the same as Halakha (Rabbinic Jewish law). The Samaritans have several groups of religious texts, which correspond to Jewish Halakha. A few examples of such texts are:

 Torah
 Samaritan Pentateuch: There are some 6,000 differences between the Samaritan Pentateuch and the Masoretic Jewish Pentateuch text; and, according to one estimate, 1,900 points of agreement between it and the Greek LXX version. Several passages in the New Testament would also appear to echo a Torah textual tradition not dissimilar to that conserved in the Samaritan text. There are several theories regarding the similarities. The variations, some corroborated by readings in the Old Latin, Syriac and Ethiopian translations, attest to the antiquity of the Samaritan text.
 Historical writings
 Samaritan Chronicle, The Tolidah (Creation to the time of Abishah)
 Samaritan Chronicle, The Chronicle of Joshua (Israel during the time of divine favor) (4th century, in Arabic and Aramaic)
 Samaritan Chronicle, Adler (Israel from the time of divine disfavor until the exile)
 Hagiographical texts
 Samaritan Halakhic Text, The Hillukh (Code of Halakha, marriage, circumcision, etc.)
 Samaritan Halakhic Text, the Kitab at-Tabbah (Halakha and interpretation of some verses and chapters from the Torah, written by Abu Al Hassan 12th century CE)
 Samaritan Halakhic Text, the Kitab al-Kafi (Book of Halakha, written by Yosef Al Ascar 14th century CE)
 Al-Asatir—legendary Aramaic texts from the 11th and 12th centuries, containing:
 Haggadic Midrash, Abu'l Hasan al-Suri
 Haggadic Midrash, Memar Markah—3rd or 4th century theological treatises attributed to Hakkam Markha
 Haggadic Midrash, Pinkhas on the Taheb
 Haggadic Midrash, Molad Maseh (On the birth of Moses)
 Defter, prayer book of psalms and hymns.
 Samaritan Haggadah

Christian sources: New Testament 
Samaria or Samaritans are mentioned in the New Testament books of Matthew, Luke, John and Acts. The Gospel of Mark contains no mention of Samaritans or Samaria. The best known reference to the Samaritans is the Parable of the Good Samaritan, found in the Gospel of Luke. The following references are found:
 When instructing his disciples as to how they should spread the word, Jesus tells them not to visit any Gentile or Samaritan city, but instead, go to the "lost sheep of Israel".
 A Samaritan village rejected a request from messengers travelling ahead of Jesus for hospitality, because the villagers did not want to facilitate a pilgrimage to Jerusalem, a practice which they saw as a violation of the Law of Moses. Two of his disciples want to "call down fire from heaven and destroy them," but Jesus rebukes them.
 The Parable of the Good Samaritan.
 Jesus healed ten lepers, of whom only one returned to praise God, and he was a Samaritan.
 Jesus asks a Samaritan woman of Sychar for water from Jacob's Well, and after spending two days telling her townsfolk "all things" as the woman expected the Messiah to do, and presumably repeating the Good News that he is the Messiah, many Samaritans become followers of Jesus. He accepts without comment the woman's assertion that she and her people are Israelites, descendants of Jacob.
 Jesus is accused of being a Samaritan and being demon-possessed. He denies the latter accusation explicitly, and denies the former previously—having already done so in his conversation with the Samaritan woman.
 Christ tells the apostles that they would receive power when the Holy Spirit comes upon them and that they would be his witnesses in "Jerusalem, and in all Judaea, and in Samaria, and unto the uttermost part of the earth."
 The Apostles are being persecuted. Philip preaches the Gospel to a city in Samaria, and the Apostles in Jerusalem hear about it. So they send the Apostles Peter and John to pray for and lay hands on the baptized believers, who then receive the Holy Spirit (vs. 17). They then return to Jerusalem, preaching the Gospel "in many villages of the Samaritans".
 Acts 9:31 says that at that time the churches had "rest throughout all Judaea and Galilee and Samaria".
 Acts 15:2–3 says that Paul and Barnabas were "being brought on their way by the church" and that they passed through "Phenice and Samaria, declaring the conversion of the Gentiles". (Phoenicia in several other English versions).

Notable Samaritans 
 Baba Rabba
 Justa
 Marinus of Neapolis

See also 
 Crimean Karaites
 Karaite Jews
 Mandaeans

Notes

Citations

Sources

External links 

 "Samaritans" in The Jewish Encyclopedia
 "Good Samaritans: Israel's smallest religious minority offers Jews a glimpse of what might have been"  by Benjamin Balint, Tablet Magazine
 "The Origin and Nature of the Samaritans and Their Relationship to Second Temple Jewish Sects", David Steinberg
 "Samaritans"  (theory on the Samaritan–Jewish tensions), Jona Lendering
 "Guards of Mount Gerizim", Alex Maist
 The Samaritans: The Earliest Jewish Sect, by James A Montgomery
 "The Messianic Hope of the Samaritans" by Jacob, Son of Aaron, High Priest of the Samaritans, Chicago, 1907

Media
 Samaritan Holidays & Feasts in the Land of Israel
 "Samaritans in Nablus and the West Bank", Rüdiger Benninghaus
 Who are The Samaritans? 2021-11-09-2021 By Religion for Breakfast

 
Ancient peoples
Ancient peoples of the Near East
Ethnic groups in Israel
Ethnic groups in the Middle East
Ethnic groups in the State of Palestine
Ethnoreligious groups
Ethnoreligious groups in Asia
Hebrew Bible nations
Indigenous peoples of Western Asia
Israelites
Kingdom of Israel (Samaria)
Semitic-speaking peoples
Ten Lost Tribes